Quantum Leap is a 1989–1993 American television series.

Quantum leap or variation, may also refer to:

In general
 quantum jump or quantum leap, in quantum physics, a transition between quantum states
 paradigm shift or quantum leap, a drastic change and advancment

Arts and entertainment
 Quantum Leap (2022 TV series), a sequel and remake of the 1989 series
 The Quantum Leap, a public art sculpture in Shrewsbury, England
 Quantum Leap, a 2021 album by Gus G
 Emergency: Quantum Leap, a 2019 EP by X1

Other uses
 Sinclair Quantum Leap or QL, a personal computer from Sinclair
 Quantum Leap Technology, a U.S. fuel cell company

See also

 
 
 quantum jump (disambiguation)
 Quantum (disambiguation)
 Leap (disambiguation)